Eta Canis Minoris (η CMi, η Canis Minoris) is a binary star system in the equatorial constellation of Canis Minor. It is approximately 318 light-years from Earth.

The primary component, η Canis Minoris A, is a yellow-white F-type giant with an apparent magnitude of +5.24.

References

F-type giants
Binary stars
Canis Minoris, Eta
Canis Minor
Durchmusterung objects
Canis Minoris, 05
058923
036265
2851